Cécile Ulbrich Tucker (born May 19, 1969) is an American rower. She competed in the women's quadruple sculls event at the 1996 Summer Olympics.  She rowed at Harvard College.

References

External links
 

1969 births
Living people
American female rowers
Olympic rowers of the United States
Rowers at the 1996 Summer Olympics
People from Warren, Maine
21st-century American women
Harvard Crimson women's rowers
Harvard College alumni